Rampura Phul is a city in the Bathinda district in the Indian state of Punjab. Phul Town serves as a Tehsil for villages in nearby area.

History
Rampura Phul was established in 1680 by Rama Choudhary, son of Phul Choudhry who was the originator of the Phulkian Dynasty. Phul’s other descendants founded 3 States in India: Jind, Nabha and Patiala.

Successfully raided the Bhattis and others including Hassan Khan and Muslim chief of Kot. Captured Kot and Bhatîân. Obtained the intendancy of the Jangal tract from Mohameddan Governor of Sirhind. Choudhary Rama Singh founded Rampura in 1680. Rama and Tiloka were baptized with Khande da amrit at the hands of the Tenth Sikh Guru, Guru Gobind Singh at Damdama Sahib. Guru Gobind Singh in a self written Hukamnama addressed to the two sons of Phul, Rama and Tiloka on 2 August 1696 called upon them for help in his fight with the Hill rajas proclaiming “tera ghar mera asey”. Rama and Tiloka later helped Banda Singh Bahādur with men and money in his early exploits (1710–16) Rama was killed at Maler Kotla in 1714.

Demographics
As of the 2001 India census, Rampura Phul urban agglomeration had a population of 51,010. Males constitute 53% of the population and females 47%. Rampura Phul has an average literacy rate of 66%, higher than the national average of 59.5%: male literacy is 70%, and female literacy is 61%. In Rampura Phul, 12% of the population is under 6 years of age.

References

External links

Cities and towns in Bathinda district